Geavdnjajávri is a lake in Bardu Municipality in Troms og Finnmark county, Norway. It's located inside Rohkunborri National Park, just  from the border with Sweden.

The lake empties in the river Gulmmaeeatnu, which flows into the lake Leinavatn, then to the lake Altevatnet. Altevatnet empties into the river Barduelva which flows into the river Målselva.

References

Bardu
Lakes of Troms og Finnmark